Annie Mack Berlein (c. 1850 - June 22, 1935) was an Irish-born American actress.

She appeared in productions opposite leading actors of her day including Edwin Booth and Joseph Jefferson (for three years in his run as Rip Van Winkle), and also appeared in a number of Harrigan and Hart productions where she played the leading female role.  She retired from the stage in 1928 after fifty-five years of acting.

She was married to actor Edward J. Mack.  Berlein was her maiden name but it was added to later stage appearances. She died in New York at the Home for Incurables in June 1935, survived by a daughter and grandson.

References

External links
 
 

1850s births
1935 deaths
19th-century American actresses
20th-century American actresses
People from County Longford
Irish emigrants to the United States (before 1923)
American stage actresses